Fanshawe Lake, is a small man-made lake east of London, Ontario. It is fed by the Thames River from the north, and is separated from the river to the southwest by Fanshawe Dam.

The Lake is a popular choice for boaters during the summer months, and also features many low flying aircraft, as the lake is used to line up approaches for aircraft landing in the airport to the south. The reservoir was closed to swimming in 2009 due to the presence of blue/green algae.

Fanshawe Lake is a popular rowing venue, hosting several regattas throughout the year, the lake is home to the London Training Centre for Canada's women's national rowing team, the University of Western Ontario's rowing team and Western-Middlesex Rowing Club.

The Fanshawe Lake trail also surrounds the lake, a 22–25 km dirt path that is popular for mountain biking, trail running, and hiking. The path is known for providing scenic views of the lake from different vantage points.

References

Lakes of Ontario
Reservoirs in Canada